Margaret Pace Park is an  urban park located in the Arts & Entertainment District and Edgewater district of Greater Downtown Miami, Florida, U.S.A. The park is located on Biscayne Bay and has tennis courts as well as personal fitness equipment. Directly across North Bayshore Drive, three large condominium complexes that were built in the 2000s housing and economic bubble overlook the park. The park underwent a $4 million renovation during this time. An even larger building is under construction adjacent the park . The historic Miami Women's Club building is located directly to the south of the park.

References

Parks in Miami
Parks in Miami-Dade County, Florida